Ciugud is a commune located in the central part of Alba County, Transylvania, Romania. It is composed of six villages: Ciugud, Drâmbar (Drombár), Hăpria (Oláhherepe), Șeușa (Sóspatak), Teleac (Újcsongvaitelep) and Limba (Dumbrava from 1960 to 2004; Lombfalva).

The commune is situated on the Transylvanian Plateau, on the left bank of the Mureș River, across from the county seat, Alba Iulia. It borders Sântimbru and Berghin communes to the north, Oarda de Jos village to the south, the city of Alba Iulia to the west, and Daia Română commune to the east.

According to the census from 2011 there was a total population of 3,048 people living in this commune, of which 96.49% are ethnic Romanians. 

The Theodora Golf Club is located in Ciugud.

References

Communes in Alba County
Localities in Transylvania